An exocrine pancreas cell is a pancreatic cell that produces enzymes that are secreted into the small intestine. These enzymes help digest food by releasing enzymes as it passes through the gastrointestinal tract. These include acinar cells, which secrete bicarbonate solution and mucin.

External links 
 Exocrine pancreas cell entry in the public domain NCI Dictionary of Cancer Terms

Pancreas anatomy